Mostow may refer to:

People

 George Mostow (1923–2017), American mathematician
 Mostow rigidity theorem
 Jonathan Mostow (born 1961), American movie and television director

Places

 Mostów, a village in Poland